This is a list of characters from the My Little Pony segments in the 1986-1987 animated anthology series My Little Pony 'n Friends.

The first My Little Pony television series was preceded by two specials: My Little Pony (1984, incorporated into the series as "Escape from Midnight Castle") and Escape from Catrina (1985, retitled "Escape from Katrina" in the series). The popularity of the specials inspired the animated series. 65 episodes aired from September 15, 1986, to September 25, 1987. A feature-length movie, My Little Pony: The Movie, was released June 6, 1986, three months before the series premiered. In the series, characters typically alternated between starring roles and cameo appearances.

Major characters 
Megan
 Voiced by: Tammy Amerson (Rescue at Midnight Castle, Escape from Catrina, My Little Pony: The Movie), Bettina Bush (TV series)
 Megan Williams is an American teenage girl and the eldest of three children. She became the main character of the first My Little Pony series. She and her siblings live on a ranch where her family keeps a horse, TJ, and a bull. Gentle and motherly, but also mature and resourceful, she acts as the Little Ponies' leader, and in times of crisis they often fly across the rainbow to find her. She keeps the Rainbow of Light, a special locket which contains a powerful rainbow, to defeat anything that is evil threatening the ponies.

 Note: Although Megan's surname (Williams) and age (thirteen) appear in the writer's guide for My Little Pony 'n Friends, they have never been mentioned in the series itself.

Danny
 Voiced by: Scott Menville
 Danny Williams is Megan's younger brother and the second oldest of the three children. He is a rambunctious redhead, who is sometimes fond of jokes although he doesn't usually do them to hurt someone's feelings. Danny sometimes feuds with his little sister Molly, and he is sometimes found leading the charge when a situation calls for reckless action.

Molly
 Voiced by: Keri Houlihan
 Molly Williams is Megan and Danny's younger sister and the youngest of the three children. Molly can be often scared around monsters and ghosts, but never too scared to fight with Danny. She is very caring, especially towards Baby Ponies.

Spike
 Voiced by: Charlie Adler
 Spike is a baby dragon with purple and green scales who is adopted by Megan and the ponies after they defeated Tirek. He has a sarcastic streak but is very supportive to the ponies and the three children.

Minor characters 
The Moochick
 Voiced by: Tony Randall
 The Moochick is a wise but eccentric gnome. He is very knowledgeable and provides answers to more unusual problems; when he's able to remember them. He lives in a secluded place in Dream Valley with his assistant Habbit the rabbit and is shown to have temporary amnesia.

The Bushwoolies
 Voiced by: Alice Playten, Sheryl Bernstein, Susan Blu, Nancy Cartwright, Russi Taylor, Charlie Adler, Frank Welker
 The Bushwoolies are a group of adorable, colourful furry creatures. They seem incapable of independent thought, thinking, speaking and acting as a group. They rarely even use their individual names, which include Chumster, Hugster and Wishful.

The Fur-bobs
 Voiced by: Unknown
 The Fur-bobs are the cousins to the Bushwoolies, and similar in character save for one noticeable difference: Fur-bobs always disagree with each other on any and every given opportunity, even if the disagreement makes no logical sense. They also tend to walk on four legs instead of two (though they're capable of walking/running either way) and possess a deep-seated fear and hatred of the Stonebacks, to the extent that the Fur-bobs constantly relocate their home territory ("Furbobbia") just to avoid being around them.

The Stonebacks
 Voiced by: Unknown
 The Stonebacks are Giant armadillo-like creatures feared and hated by the Fur-bobs. Megan discovers that the Stonebacks, who lack the ability to speak and can only snort and grunt, only want to befriend the Furbobs, but have no way of communicating it.

The Grundle King
 Voiced by: Danny DeVito
 The Grundle King is the leader of the Grundles. He seems to be rather ugly but sweet, sometimes speaks in rhymes, and is not very smart, but has a kind heart. He and the rest of the Grundles used to live in Grundleland before Hydia smoozed it and now reside in the remains of Dream Castle.

The Grundles
 Voiced by: Unknown
 The Grundles are a small race of troll-like creatures led by the Grundle King. They used to live in Grundleland before Hydia smoozed it and now reside in the remains of Dream Castle. They may look like monsters, but they are friendly.

The Ponies

Unicorn Ponies 
Unicorn Ponies each possess a unique magical ability, in addition to the power to teleport by 'winking in and out' although not all of them were seen using it.

Pegasus Ponies 
Pegasus Ponies can fly using their featured wings, with the ability to carry considerable weight into the air with them. All of the Pegasus Ponies except North Star, Surprise, Locket, Twilight and babies (excluding Baby Lofty) have cameos in 'Baby, It's Cold Outside'.

Earth Ponies 
Earth Ponies are the most like real horses, without horns, wings or other fanciful additions. However several Earth Ponies had their special talents. They are also notably good jumpers.

Flutter Ponies 
Flutter Ponies are ponies with tiny bodies, curly hair, longer legs than regular ponies and fairy-like wings. The Flutter Ponies may appear delicate, but in truth, they possess a powerful ability called the Utter Flutter, which allows them to blow away everything in their path by flapping their wings in a rapid speed. They are rarely seen, preferring to live in seclusion, usually in Flutter Valley. Honeysuckle, Morning Glory and Rosedust were the only notable ones in the first My Little Pony series. In the movie a lot of Flutter ponies are seen although they have no cutie marks and weren't produced as toys. In Bright Lights appear duplicates of Forget-Me-Not, Peach Blussom, Morning Glory, Honeysuckle and Lily.

Seaponies/Baby Seaponies 
The Seaponies are brightly colored seahorse-like creatures who dwell in the rivers and lakes of Dream Valley. They love underwater polo and can perform elaborate songs and dance numbers. They only appeared in the two Generation 1 Specials and they are based on the Hippocamp, a mythological creature shared by Phoenician and Greek mythology. A sub-line of the Seaponies called Baby Seaponies debuted later in 1985 and later in My Little Pony: The Movie.

Princess Ponies 
The Princess Ponies live near the Heart of Ponyland on a remote island, and use their wands to maintain the balance of Ponyland's magic. They each have a medallion symbol and wear a tall princess hat. They only appeared in The Quest of the Princess Ponies. Princess Tiffany is the best-known out of them.

Big Brother Ponies 
The Big Brother Ponies were the only males in Dream Valley, and are all earth ponies. They return from a year-long race around the world at the beginning of Somnambula. They have hairy hooves (like Shires) and wear bandanas. Oddly enough, Quarterback is referred to as Score. Except for Knight Shade, they are the only male ponies to appear in series.

Baby Ponies 
The Baby Ponies were ponies who were born from the reflections of their mothers. However several Baby Ponies never had their own mothers and had a lot of minor roles in several My Little Pony episodes.

Special Episode Ponies 
These characters appeared only in 'Rescue from Midnight Castle' and 'Escape from Catrina'. They never appeared in series. Some of them have ruffled hair and horseshoes.

Antagonists

References 

My Little Pony characters
My Little Pony (1986)
My Little Pony (1986)